David (Daudi) Mwiraria (3 September 1938 – 13 April 2017) was the Minister for Environment and Natural Resources previously Finance Minister of Kenya until December 2007 when Kenya held its General Elections. Running for re election on a Party of National Unity ticket, defending his seat as Member of parliament for North Imenti Constituency, he was defeated by Silas Muriuki, who was running on a Mazingira Green Party of Kenya ticket.

Prior to going into elective politics, he had a long and distinguished career in Kenya's civil service, serving in various senior positions hence his having recently appeared as a witness before Kenya's Truth, Justice and Reconciliation Commission as a witness to testify on the Government of Kenya's role in the Wagalla massacre.
Following allegations that he had been involved in the Anglo Leasing Scandal, he decided to resign as Finance Minister on 1 February 2006. He maintained that he was innocent and claimed that he was stepping down to pave way for investigations.  Despite there being no investigation report clearing Mwiraria, President Mwai Kibaki appointed him Minister for Environment on 24 July 2007.
He got his master's degree in statistics from the Makerere University, Uganda 1966 (then part of the University of East Africa).  
Mwiraria features prominently in audio recordings released on the internet in 2006 by John Githongo, exiled former Permanent Secretary in the Kenya Government, which indicate Mwiraria was trying to stop Githongo's inquiries into the theft of over 700 million US Dollars in a series of 18 security related contracts, colloquially called Anglo Leasing.
He died of bone cancer on 13 April 2017 at Karen Hospital in Nairobi, Kenya.

Travel ban
In December 2007, Mwiraria, Nicholas Biwott, and Ramniklal Panacha Shah were banned from traveling to or through the United Kingdom due to the then pending corruption charges.

References

External links
 https://web.archive.org/web/20070927182433/http://www.parliament.go.ke/MPs/members_mwiraria_d.php
 https://web.archive.org/web/20070809080247/http://www.marsgroupkenya.org/pages/clips/Mwiraria-Githongo.php
 http://www.eck.or.ke/elections2007/index.php?option=com_content&view=article&id=4&Itemid=2&menuGroup=parliamentary&userParams[]=51

1938 births
2017 deaths
Meru people
Makerere University alumni
Government ministers of Kenya
Party of National Unity (Kenya) politicians
Members of the National Assembly (Kenya)
Ministers of Finance of Kenya